Gabula may refer to :

 Gabula (Syria), an ancient city, former bishopric and present Latin Catholic titular see
 Gabula (general) (died 1681), in China
 William Gabula, a Ugandan leader